Love at Second Sight is a 1999 Israeli independent underground dramatic art film directed by Michal Bat-Adam.

Synopsis
She begins looking for him, becoming obsessed with this search: Although Nina knows nothing about this man, she feels as if her relation to him is not some caprice, and knows he is meant for her and that she must find him, for, otherwise, she may not be able to live with herself.

Reception
Writing in Haaretz, critic  opined that the film, "although taking place in contemporary times, has something old in it, of an older, different, Israel, much older in fact, in which young women lived with elderly men and served their most elementary romantic fantasies."

References

External links

Love at Second Sight at the TCM Movie Database

1999 drama films
1999 independent films
1999 films
Films about old age
Films about photographers
Films directed by Michal Bat-Adam
Films set in Israel
Films shot in Israel
1990s Hebrew-language films
Israeli drama films
Israeli independent films